Tomaž Prosen (born 1970) is a Slovenian theoretical and mathematical physicist. His research has spanned non-equilibrium dynamics, statistical mechanics, quantum transport, and chaos theory.

Early career 

Prosen earned his Diploma in Physics in 1991, and a Doctorate of Science in 1995, both from the University of Ljubljana. He finished both at a significantly younger age than usual. ISI named him a ‘Citation Superstar’ as one of the most cited young scientists in Slovenia in 2000. He was made a Full Professor at the University of Ljubljana by outstanding early election in 2008.

Research 

Tomaž Prosen is primarily known for providing the first exact solutions for models of open quantum many-body systems and for the discovery of novel kinds of quantum conservation laws that settled long-standing questions about the nature of transport in fundamental models of low-dimensional quantum materials, such as the Heisenbeg spin chains and the one-dimensional Hubbard model. The latter work also provided a full description of canonical ensembles of quantum integrable systems paving the way for extensions of thermodynamics to integrable systems. He is also known for pioneering a novel approach for establishing quantum chaos in spin-1/2 systems, for which previously known semi-classical methods fail. This approach challenged conventional beliefs in theoretical physics by providing an exact solution to the dynamics of a chaotic model.

Notes

External links 

 Group Homepage of T Prosen at the University of Ljubljana
 T Prosen Google Scholar Profile

1970 births
Living people
Slovenian physicists
Quantum physicists
Theoretical physicists
Mathematical physicists
Academic staff of the University of Ljubljana
Members of the European Academy of Sciences and Arts